Sugar and Beyond is a double album by the British singer-songwriter Lynsey de Paul released on 18 March 2013. De Paul personally oversaw the project and was involved in the digital remastering of the tracks from the original tapes. The CD includes all her hits as well as the two LPs released in the period between 1972 and 1974. The majority of the tracks on this CD had not been reissued previously. The first CD (and the first four tracks on the second CD) contained all of the recordings for MAM Records (the four singles with A-sides and B sides) as well as tracks from the Surprise album. The version of "Sugar Me" included is the longer album version produced by de Paul, rather than the single version which was produced by Gordon Mills. "Sugar and Beyond" also contains two unreleased songs performed by de Paul from 1972 and orchestrated by Nick Drake collaborator, Robert Kirby - "House of Cards" and "Taking It On", a song co-written with Ron Roker and previously released by Sacha Distel and Petula Clark.

The second CD includes the one off hit single on the Warner Bros label "Ooh I Do" and its B-side "Nothing Really Lasts Forever" as well as tracks from the album Taste Me... Don't Waste Me and concluded with "No, Honestly" and the B-side of this single "Central Park Arrest", which was a UK hit for Thunderthighs. All of the songs of the album were either written or co-written by de Paul. The album came with a booklet with photographs and memorabilia from de Paul's personal archive, as well her as anecdotes about the songs and her career.

The album received positive reviews in the music press such as the UK music magazine Record Collector, Music Week, and the US music magazine Goldmine. It was also listed as one of the best albums of 2013 by Dave Bash of International Pop Overthrow.

References

2013 albums
Lynsey de Paul albums